Years Later is the third studio album by  American rapper Soulja Slim.

Track listing

References

Soula Slim at AllMusic

2002 albums
Soulja Slim albums